Rhabdophis subminiatus, commonly called the red-necked keelback or red-necked keelback snake, is a species of venomous snake in the subfamily Natricinae of the family Colubridae. The species is endemic to Asia.

Description
Rhabdophis subminiatus has a greenish hue with red and yellow regions near the head. Female is much larger than male, mating behavior multiple males may swarm a single female.

Habitat and diet
The red-necked keelback generally lives near ponds, where it consumes frogs and fish.

Snakebite and venom
Rhabdophis subminiatus is a rear-fanged species and was previously thought to be harmless. However, following one fatal and several near-fatal envenomations, the toxicity of its venom was investigated. As a result, it has recently been reclassified as a dangerous species. Rear-fanged snakes need to bite and hold on, or repeatedly bite, to have any effect on humans. A chewing action facilitates envenomation, as the venom ducts open to fangs that are externally grooved (not hollow) and are posterior in the oral cavity. R. subminiatus has enlarged and ungrooved teeth. The species has two enlarged teeth in the back of the jaw. Located in the upper jaw is a gland known as Duvernoy's gland, which produces an extremely venomous secretion.

Symptoms caused by venom
When the snake bites, the salivary venom mixture is not injected, but it flows into the punctures produced by the upper jaw's rear teeth, which can penetrate the skin of humans. The venom from R. subminiatus has been responsible for internal hemorrhaging, including hemorrhaging of the brain, as well as nausea, coagulopathy, and even disseminated intravascular coagulation. Also, when the venom was tested on animals, kidney failure was reported. Caution should be taken when dealing with patients who have been bitten by the red-necked keelback snake. No further injury such as injections should be used because this may cause excessive bleeding in the bite victim. Although most bites of humans from R. subminiatus are involved with the front teeth and do not cause adverse effects, rare bites from the rear fangs can be lethal.
Studies in mice on the biological activity of the venom of the red-necked keel-back snake, Rhabdophis subminiatus, showed that the venom contained a potent Factor X activator and had intense defibrinogenating activity; the overall proteolytic activity of the venom was low, and this correlated well with its negligible fibrinogenolytic and fibrinolytic activities. Only one antivenom tested was shown to have weak neutralizing activity against the venom in mice. This species of snake has recently been added to the schedule of the Dangerous Wild Animals Act, 1976.

Etymology

The specific name subminiatus refers to the typical reddish coloration ("miniatus" = "scarlet, vermilion"), which may be limited to the neck, or more extensive (e.g., photo at left). The subspecific name, helleri, is in honor of American zoologist Edmund Heller.

Geographic range
The red-necked keelback can be found in:

Bangladesh 
Indonesia (Sumatra, Borneo, Java, Sulawesi)
Thailand, Vietnam, Cambodia, Laos, Burma
 West Malaysia
Bhutan
Nepal
India ( Tripura, Assam, Meghalaya, West Bengal, Sikkim, Arunachal Pradesh, Mizoram, Nagaland )
China (Yunnan, Guangxi, Guangdong, Fujian, Hong Kong, Hainan)

References

External links

 R. subminiatus Snakebite

Further reading
Boulenger GA (1893). Catalogue of the Snakes in the British Museum (Natural History). Voume I., Containing the Families ... Colubridæ Aglyphæ, part. London: Trustees of the British Museum (Natural History). (Taylor and Francis, printers). xiii + 448 pp. + Plates I-XXVIII. (Tropidonotus subminiatus, pp. 256–257).
Bulian J (1999). "Über die Schlangenfauna eines Gartens in Südthailand ". Elaphe 7 (4): 61-67. (in German).
Das I (2002). A Photographic Guide to Snakes and other Reptiles of India. Sanibel Island, Florida: Ralph Curtis Books, 144 pp. . (Rhabdophis subminiatus, p. 44).
Schlegel H (1837). Essai sur la physionomie des serpens. Partie Générale. xxviii + 251 pp. + Partie Descriptive. 606 + xvi pp. Amsterdam: M.H. Schonekat. (Tropidonotus subminiatus, new species, pp. 313–314 in Partie Descriptive). (in French).
Schmidt KP (1925). "New Reptiles and a New Salamander from China". American Museum Novitates (157): 1-5. (Natrix helleri, new species, p. 3).
Smith MA (1943). The Fauna of British India, Ceylon and Burma, Including the Whole of the Indo-Chinese Sub-region. Reptilia and Amphibia. Vol. III.—Serpentes. London: Secretary of State for India. (Taylor and Francis, printers). xii + 583 pp. (Natrix subminiata, pp. 302–303).

subminiatus
Snakes of Asia
Reptiles of Bangladesh
Reptiles of Bhutan
Reptiles of Brunei
Reptiles of Myanmar
Reptiles of Cambodia
Snakes of China
Reptiles of India
Reptiles of Indonesia
Reptiles of Laos
Reptiles of Malaysia
Reptiles of Nepal
Reptiles of Thailand
Snakes of Vietnam
Reptiles described in 1837
Taxa named by Hermann Schlegel
Reptiles of Borneo